Richard Ryve (also Reve) (d. 1594) was a Canon of Windsor from 1560 to 1594.

Career

He was educated at All Souls College, Oxford where he graduated BA in 1534, MA in 1537.

He was appointed:
Rector of Berkhamsted 1552
School master of Berkhamsted Grammar School 1552
Rector of Marsh Gibbon 1561
Prebendary of Westminster 1560
Chaplain to Queen Elizabeth I

He was appointed to the eleventh stall in St George's Chapel, Windsor Castle in 1560 and held the canonry until 1594.

Notes 

1594 deaths
Canons of Windsor
Alumni of All Souls College, Oxford
Year of birth unknown